Sir Giles Brydges, 1st Baronet (1573 – August 1637) was an English politician who sat in the House of Commons  at various times between 1621 and 1629.

Brydges was the son of the Hon. Charles Brydges of Wilton Castle, Ross-on-Wye, Herefordshire, younger son of John Brydges, 1st Baron Chandos, and his wife Jane, daughter of Sir Edward Carne. He matriculated at  St Alban Hall, Oxford on 27 Nov 1590 aged 17. He was created a baronet on 17 May 1627.

In 1621, Brydges was elected Member of Parliament for Tewkesbury. In 1625 he was High Sheriff of Herefordshire. He was elected MP for Herefordshire in 1625 and 1628, and sat until 1629 when King Charles decided to rule without parliament for eleven years.

On 16 January 1620 Brydges married Mary Scudamore, daughter of Sir James Scudamore MP of Holme Lacy, Hereford. His grandson, James, succeeded as the 8th Baron Chandos in 1676.

References

 
 

1573 births
1637 deaths
English MPs 1621–1622
English MPs 1625
English MPs 1628–1629
High Sheriffs of Herefordshire
Alumni of St Alban Hall, Oxford
People from Tewkesbury
Politicians from Gloucestershire
Baronets in the Baronetage of England
Younger sons of barons